"So Gone" is a song by American R&B recording artist Monica. It was one out of several tracks rapper-producer Missy Elliott wrote and produced along with Kenneth Cunningham and Jamahl Rye from production duo Spike & Jamahl for Monica's fourth studio album, After the Storm (2003), following the delay and subsequent reconstruction of her 2002 album, All Eyez on Me. Incorporating elements of hip hop and 1970s-style smooth jazz as well as soul music, it features a sample from the 1976 song "You Are Number One", penned by Zyah Ahmonuel and performed by The Whispers.

Following the less successful chart performances of previous singles "All Eyez on Me" and "Too Hood", J Records released the song on April 8, 2003, as the lead single from After the Storm in the United States. The song was lauded by critics, who praised its vintage touches and sparse hip hop influences. "So Gone" became Monica's biggest commercial success in years, reaching number 10 on the US Billboard Hot 100 and the top of both the Hot R&B/Hip-Hop Singles & Tracks and Hot Dance Club Play charts, becoming her first chart topper since 1999's "Angel of Mine".

The song's music video, directed by Chris Robinson and shot at Miami's South Beach in April 2003, features Monica as one half of a dysfunctional relationship in which she prejudges her man to cheat on her. It ends on a cliffhanger, which leads to the video for the album's second single, "Knock Knock". Nominated for a Soul Train Music Award for Best R&B/Soul Single, Monica performed the song on several televised events, including 106 & Park, The Today Show, The Tonight Show with Jay Leno and MTV's Total Request Live.

Background and recording

"So Gone" was written and produced by rapper Missy Elliott along with Kenneth Cunningham and Jamahl Rye from duo Spike & Jamahl. Recorded by Demacio Castellon at Hit Factory Criteria in Miami, Florida, the song was mixed by Scott Kieklak, while Marcella Araica and Javier Valeverde both assisted in the audio engineering of "So Gone". Backing vocals for the track were recorded by Monica, with additional vocals provided by fellow R&B singer Tweet. Built around a prominent sample from the 1976 song "You Are Number One", originally performed by American vocal group The Whispers, writer Zyah Ahmonuel holds partial songwriter credits on the song.

The record is one out of three Elliott-produced additions to the partially re-worked After the Storm album, commissioned by J Records head and executive producer Clive Davis after Elliott's 2002 success with her fourth studio album, Under Construction, and the delay of Monica's original third studio album, All Eyez On Me, the year before. It was conceived during a studio session week in the Goldmind recordings studios in Miami in early 2003, with most of it being "done in probably three or four hours." Speaking about its sound, Monica said in an interview with MTV News: "'So Gone' takes you back to when people first heard me. It's got that feeling like no holds barred, not trying to cater to any one audience." Initially recorded for the US re-release of All Eyez on Me, it was later featured on the re-tooled After the Storm album only.

Lyrically, the "So Gone" protagonist sings about almost losing her mind over an unfaithful man. "The song is saying that I'm so gone that I'm not thinking straight," Monica told Jet Magazine. "I do that sometimes because I'm pretty hard. She [Missy Elliott] may have taken some of the real life from me and put it into song." Elliott proposed the singer to start rapping over the record — a venture, that would become "second nature" to her: "Missy kept telling me that I act like a rapper so she encouraged me to rap on 'So Gone' and 'Knock Knock'. She would put together rhythms." Elliott protégé, singer Tweet, and frequent collaborator, rapper Busta Rhymes, joined the recording sessions to provide vocals for a remix version of the song,
which was later also included as "Outro" on After the Storm.

Critical reception
"So Gone" was generally lauded by contemporary music critics, who complimented its vintage sound. Lewis Dene of BBC Music described the song as a "infectious 70s soul groove", while Chuck Arnold from People magazine wrote in his album review that "So Gone", one of "three standout tracks produced and co-written by Missy Elliott, samples the Whispers' 1977 song "You Are Number One" to bring about a retro-soul reverie reminiscent of Aretha Franklin's 1972 hit "Day Dreaming". Los Angeles Times writer Natalie Nichols noted that "the obsessive love call of an unrequited female suitor and the tune boasts a hip hop beat from Missy Elliott production, with funky-to-humorous old-school touches including horns and vinyl surface noise."
Chuck Taylor from Billboard magazine felt that the song, "with its sparse, hip-hop-influenced" production and "vintage touches" was "instantly infectious". He wrote that her "the around-the-way-girl persona we've grown to love is on full display [...] 'So Gone' could be just what Monica needs to stay relevant."

Chart performance
"So Gone" was one of Monica's biggest commercial successes in years, debuting at number 66 and reaching number 10 on the U.S. Billboard Hot 100, becoming her 8th and last top ten hit. The song's relatively high peak position on the Hot 100 contrasted with the chart performance of most of the singer's previous singles released between 1999 and 2003, some of which had failed to chart on the Hot 100 or even its Bubbling Under chart. It, however, became Monica's tenth domestical top 10 hit of her career and her first top 10 single since "Angel of Mine" in early 1999. "So Gone" stayed in the top forty for twenty weeks and was ranked thirty-ninth on the Hot 100 2003 year-end charts.

The song also spent five consecutive weeks at number one on Billboards component Hot R&B/Hip-Hop Singles & Tracks chart, becoming Monica's first chart topper since 1998's "The First Night" and sixth number-one hit in total. It was ranked fourth on the Hot R&B/Hip-Hop Singles 2003 year-end chart behind 50 Cent's "In da Club", R. Kelly's "Ignition (Remix)" and Aaliyah's "Miss You". The "Scum frog Club Mix" of the song also spent one week on top of the Hot Dance Club Play chart. Outside North America, "So Gone" received a limited vinyl (12") release only, and as a result achieved minor success in non-U.S. markets. While it still reached a moderately successful number 17 on the Canadian chart, it peaked at number 82 on the UK Singles Chart.

Music video

The music video for "So Gone" was shot by director Chris Robinson, and produced by Dawn Rose for Partizan Entertainment. Many interior shots were filmed in the same Key Biscayne, Florida mansion used in the 1983 film Scarface, as well as various locations throughout the South Beach neighborhood in Miami, Florida on April 1 and 2, 2003. Actor Derek Luke co-stars as Monica's love interest, while producer Missy Elliott appears in a handful of scenes.

The plot depicts Monica as a wounded girlfriend, who believes having discovered her man's hidden secret. "The video is like [Luke] and I are in a relationship," Monica told in an interview with MTV News. "In my mind I think he's cheating. As you see in the video, my mind's playing tricks on me. I've destroyed his home and all this stuff for no reason. I get arrested as you would in real life." The video ends with Monica being taken away in a police cruiser, introducing a cliffhanger, which leads to the video for the album's second single, "Knock Knock".

The "So Gone" video premiered worldwide on April 23, 2003 at the end on BET's Access Granted. It charted well on several video-chart countdowns, including peak positions of number 2 on BET's 106 & Park, and of number 6 on MTV's TRL.

Track listings

Notes
 denotes co-producer(s)
 denotes additional producer(s)
 denotes vocal producer(s)
Sample credits
"So Gone (Album Version)" contains excerpts from the composition "You Are Number One" (1976) by The Whispers.
"So Gone (Remix)" contains samples from "Violation" (1978) by Saint Tropez and "Bonita Applebum" (1990) by A Tribe Called Quest.
"All Eyez on Me" contains excerpts from the composition "P.Y.T. (Pretty Young Thing)" (1982) by Michael Jackson.

Credits and personnel
Credits adapted from the liner notes of After the Storm.

 Monica Arnold – lead vocals, background vocals
 Marcella Araica – audio engineering
 Demacio Castellon – recording
 Tom Coyne – mastering

 Missy Elliott – production
 Tweet – additional vocals
 Javier Valeverde – audio engineering
 Scott Kieklak – mixing

Charts

Weekly charts

Year-end charts

Release history

See also
List of number-one dance singles of 2003 (U.S.)
List of number-one R&B singles of 2003 (U.S.)

References

External links

Monica (singer) songs
2003 songs
2003 singles
Music videos directed by Chris Robinson (director)
Songs written by Missy Elliott
J Records singles
Songs about infidelity